Under the Whyte notation for the classification of steam locomotives by wheel arrangement,  represents a configuration of a four-wheeled leading bogie, four powered and coupled driving wheels, and two trailing wheels supporting part of the weight of the boiler and firebox. This allows a larger firebox and boiler than the  configuration.

This wheel arrangement is commonly known as the Atlantic type, although it is also sometimes called a Milwaukee or 4-4-2 Milwaukee, after the Milwaukee Road, which employed it in high speed passenger service.

Overview
While the wheel arrangement and type name Atlantic would come to fame in the fast passenger service competition between railroads in the United States by mid-1895, the tank locomotive version of the  Atlantic type first made its appearance in the United Kingdom in 1880, when William Adams designed the 1 Class T of the London, Tilbury and Southend Railway (LT&SR).

The  is the tank locomotive equivalent of a 4-4-0 American type tender locomotive, but with the frame extended to allow for a fuel bunker behind the cab. This necessitated the addition of a trailing truck to support the additional weight at the rear end of the locomotive. As such, the tank version of the  wheel arrangement appeared earlier than the tender version.

The tender version of the  originated in the United States of America, evolving from the less stable 2-4-2 Columbia type wheel arrangement, and was built especially for mainline passenger express services. One advantage of the type over its predecessor 4-4-0 American type was that the trailing wheels allowed a larger and deeper firebox to be placed behind the driving wheels.

The first use of the  wheel arrangement for a tender locomotive was under an experimental double-firebox locomotive, built to the design of George Strong at the Hinkley Locomotive Works in 1888. The locomotive was not successful and was scrapped soon afterwards. The wheel arrangement was named after the second North American  tender locomotive class, built by the Baldwin Locomotive Works in 1894 for use on the Atlantic Coast Line of the Philadelphia and Reading Railway.

Baldwin's ideas on 4-4-2 tender locomotives were soon copied in the United Kingdom, initially by Henry Ivatt of the Great Northern Railway (GNR) with his GNR Class C1 Klondyke Atlantic of 1898. These were quickly followed by John Aspinall's Class 7, known as the High-Flyer, for the Lancashire and Yorkshire Railway (L&YR).

Usage

Austria-Hungary

The first European Atlantic locomotive type was the Austro-Hungarian IId class of the Kaiser Ferdinands-Nordbahn (KFNB). It was built from 1895 and later became the 308 class on the Imperial Royal State Railways (kaiserlich und königlich Staatsbahnen, kkStB).

It was followed from 1901 by the XVIb class of the Austrian Northwestern Railway (Österreichische Nordwestbahn, ÖNWB) that later became the kkStB class 208, and then by the kkStB 108 class. They were not numerous, though. All three classes together numbered a little more than one hundred locomotives.

Apart from the Austrian locomotives, the Hungarian State Railways (Magyar Államvasutak or MÁV) also operated some Atlantic classes.

Belgium

In 1939, the National Railway Company of Belgium (NMBS/SNCB) introduced six Class 12 streamlined Atlantic locomotives on the fast lightweight boat trains that ran on the  line between Brussels and Ostend. They were fully streamlined, except for openings to provide access to the valve gear and motion, and had inside cylinders with outside valve gear to reduce oscillation at speed. The class remained in service until 1962.

Germany

The Atlantic, known in Germany as the 2'B1' wheel arrangement, enjoyed some short-lived popularity in the German states. Between 1902 and 1906, the  class of the Prussian state railways was built to two competing designs, 159 locomotives to the design of August von Borries and 79 locomotives to that of Alfred de Glehn. Between 1908 and 1910, Hanomag built 99 Prussian S 9 locomotives. All were four-cylinder compound engines working on saturated steam. The Prussian Atlantics were withdrawn shortly after the First World War and some were given to France, Belgium and Poland.

Atlantics were also adopted in some other German states.
 Twelve Pfalz P3.1 class locomotives were built for the Palatinate Railway (Pfalzbahn) from 1898. In addition, eleven Pfalz P4 class locomotives were built from 1905.
 Fifteen Saxon X V class locomotives were built for the Royal Saxon State Railways from 1902. 
 Eighteen Baden IId class locomotives were built for the Grand Duchy of Baden State Railways from 1902.
 In 1900, the Royal Bavarian State Railways imported two 4-4-2 locomotives from Baldwin Locomotive Works in the United States of America and classified them Bavarian S 2/5. Ten more locomotives were built by Maffei in 1904.

India
In India, the broad gauge E class was rebuilt in the 1940s and survived into the 1970s.

Japan

In 1897, 24 6600 Class Atlantics were built for the  gauge Japanese Railways by Baldwin Locomotive Works in the United States of America. Six more locomotives, built to the same Japanese design, were built for the Cape Government Railways in South Africa immediately following the completion of the Japanese order.

Mozambique
By the 1980s, the last Atlantics at work in the world were a few  examples in Mozambique. These survived reported retirements to operate into the beginning of the 21st century, becoming some of the last working steam in the country. Exceptionally, they had outlasted much larger and newer power, including Garratt locomotives.

Philippines

The Manila Railway (ancestor to the Philippine National Railways) purchased five 100-class locomotives from the North British Locomotive Company in 1906. These were the first tender locomotives in Philippine service. In 1949, 7 American-built 4-8-2s were also numbered as the 100 class, presuming that the locomotives have been retired after World War II.

South Africa

In 1897, additional locomotives were urgently required by the Cape Government Railways (CGR) for the section south of Kimberley, at a time when locomotive production in England was being disrupted by strikes, while simultaneously the steamship companies had suddenly doubled all their freight rates to the Cape of Good Hope. As a result, six locomotives were ordered from Baldwin Locomotive Works. These were built in addition to a just fulfilled order of 6600 Class Atlantics, built for and to a design by the  gauge Japanese Railways.

The locomotives were completed within sixty days of receipt of the order and, to circumvent the exorbitant freight charges of the steamship lines, were shipped to the Cape by sailing ship, with the result that the steamship companies promptly reverted to their old rates. Nicknamed the Hatracks, the locomotives were designated 4th Class on the CGR. When they came onto South African Railways (SAR) stock in 1912, they were considered obsolete and designated Class 04. They remained in SAR service until 1931.

United Kingdom

Tank locomotives
The T Atlantic was introduced into the United Kingdom in 1880 by William Adams, who designed the LT&SR 1 Class on behalf of Thomas Whitelegg of the London, Tilbury and Southend Railway (LT&SR). This was the first use of this wheel arrangement in the world. It was intended for heavy suburban trains around London and 36 locomotives were built by Sharp Stewart and Company and Nasmyth, Wilson and Company between 1880 and 1892. Adams later developed the type into his successful suburban 415 class for the London and South Western Railway.

The LT&SR continued to build  tank locomotives after 1897, with the Class 37, Class 51 and Class 79. Henry Ivatt of the Great Northern Railway (GNR) also built sixty Class C2 tank locomotives between 1898 and 1907, for use on local and commuter trains in Yorkshire and North London.

During the first decade of the twentieth century, the Atlantic tank locomotive became very popular in the United Kingdom.
 The Great Central Railway’s Class 9K and Class 9L were built between 1903 and 1907. They later became the LNER classes C13 and C14.
 The Great Western Railway’s 2221 Class was built between 1905 and 1912.
 The London and North Western Railway’s Precursor Tank Class was built between 1906 and 1909.
 Four classes were introduced by the London, Brighton and South Coast Railway, the I1 class, I2 class, I3 class and I4 class.

Tender locomotives

Following Henry Ivatt’s GNR Class C1 Klondyke Atlantic of 1898 and John Aspinall's L&YR Class 7 High-Flyer, of which forty were built between 1899 and 1902, a lot of interest was shown in the Atlantic type by British railways during the first decade of the twentieth century, especially for express passenger train service. Between 1902 and 1908, Ivatt built eighty larger boilered versions of his GNR Class C1, which were known as the Large Boiler Class C1. These remained in service until the early 1950s.

In 1903, for use in comparative trials against his own designs, George Jackson Churchward of the Great Western Railway (GWR) purchased three French De Glehn compound s, beginning with the GWR no. 102 La France and followed by two larger locomotives in 1905. Fourteen members of his two-cylinder 2900 Saint class locomotives were subsequently either built or rebuilt with this wheel arrangement, including one four-cylinder GWR 4000 Star class, no. 40 North Star. All of these were later rebuilt to a 4-6-0 wheel arrangement.

Wilson Worsdell of the North Eastern Railway (NER) designed his classes V and 4CC between 1903 and 1906, while his successor on the NER, Vincent Raven, introduced his V/09 and NER Class Z classes between 1910 and 1917. By 1918, however, the  type had been largely superseded by the 4-6-0 type in the United Kingdom. 

The London, Brighton and South Coast Railway (LB&SCR) H1 class, introduced by D. E. Marsh in 1905 and 1906, was copied from the plans of the Ivatt C1 class, with minimal alterations. In 1911, L.B. Billinton was granted authority to construct a further six examples incorporating Schmidt superheaters, which became the LB&SCR H2 class.

William Paton Reid of the North British Railway built twenty examples of his North British Atlantic, later known as H class, between 1906 and 1911. Two more were built after his retirement and the whole class became the LNER C11 Class in the 1923 grouping, while John G. Robinson of the Great Central Railway (GCR) introduced his 8D and 8E classes of three-cylinder compound locomotives in 1905 and 1906.
.

Preserved locomotives
Several 4-4-2 locomotives were preserved in the United Kingdom. Bearing in mind that this information may become outdated over time, some known examples are:

 Great Northern Railway no. 990 Henry Oakley is part of the National Collection at the National Railway Museum in York, on static display at Bressingham Steam and Gardens in Norfolk.
 Great Northern Railway no. 251, the first large-boilered GNR Class C1, is part of the National Collection.
 The Bluebell Railway is building a replica of a London, Brighton and South Coast Railway (LB&SCR) Atlantic, similar to the GNR large boilered Atlantics. They are also in possession of a London and South Western Railway (LSWR) 415 class locomotive, no. 488.
 The Great Western Society is working on a replica of a 4-6-0 Saint class locomotive. Some of these ran as Atlantic s for comparative purposes and it was planned that the replica would also run in an Atlantic wheel configuration from time to time.
 One of the four London, Tilbury and Southend Railway (LT&SR) 79 class locomotives, no. 80 Thundersley, is preserved at the Bressingham Steam Museum in Norfolk.

United States

The original Atlantics in the United States were built with the hauling of wood-frame passenger cars in mind and came in a variety of configurations, including the four-cylinder Vauclain compound which had previously been used on express 4-4-0 American, 4-6-0 Ten-wheeler and 2-4-2 Columbia locomotives. Around the 1910s, railroads started buying heavier steel passenger cars, which precipitated the introduction of the  type as the standard passenger locomotive. Nonetheless, the Chicago and North Western, Southern Pacific, Santa Fe and Pennsylvania railroads used  Atlantics until the end of steam locomotive use in the 1950s, with some even being utilized in local freight and switching service.

One of the best-known groups of s in the United States was the Pennsylvania Railroad's vast fleet of E class Atlantics, culminating in the PRR E6s class.

Although Atlantics were sometimes used as mountain helpers prior to the First World War, they were not well-suited for mountain grades. They had large-diameter driving wheels, in some cases exceeding , which were adequate for  trains. They tended to oscillate at higher speeds when the drive rods were connected to the rear pair of drivers. This was not standard practice in the U.S., however. The nation's biggest user of the type was the Santa Fe with 178 of the type.

These were never used on the road's Rocky Mountain grades; even on the flat plains of Kansas the Atlantics were soon overwhelmed by the weight of the newest all-steel,  passenger cars. Despite their excellent performance, most were retired long before other locomotives of their era, and the few survivors wound up on light local trains.

Milwaukee Road

The Chicago, Milwaukee, St. Paul and Pacific Railroad (Milwaukee Road) used a streamlined Atlantic type on its midwestern Hiawatha passenger train service that was instituted in 1935. Four  locomotives of the Milwaukee Road class A were constructed for this service in 1935. These s were reportedly the first steam locomotives ever designed and built to reach  on a daily basis.

These Atlantics with their distinctive streamlining shrouds were designed by industrial designer Otto Kuhler. An unusual feature of this locomotive was the drive onto the front coupled axle, which improved riding quality at speed.

The locomotives were cross balanced and ran on  drivers. Designed for a light-weight train of five to six passenger cars, they were considered as probably the fastest steam locomotives ever built in the United States, possibly capable of matching any locomotive in the world.

None survived, since all four locomotives were withdrawn and scrapped between 1949 and 1951.

Preserved locomotives
Several 4-4-2 locomotives were preserved in the United States. Bearing in mind that this information may become outdated over time, some known examples are:
 Southern Pacific no. 3025 at the Travel Town Museum in Los Angeles, CA.
 Chicago & North Western no. 1015 at the National Museum of Transportation in St. Louis, MO.
 Pennsylvania Railroad E6s no. 460 at the Railroad Museum of Pennsylvania in Strasburg, PA.
 Pennsylvania Railroad no. 7002, formerly no. 8063, at the Railroad Museum of Pennsylvania in Strasburg, PA. It has steamed since preservation, but is now static.
 Michigan Central no. 254 (later no. 7953, then New York Central no. 8085 before being sold to the Detroit, Toledo & Ironton Railroad as no. 45) at the Henry Ford Museum in Dearborn, MI.
 Central Railroad of New Jersey no. 592 at the B&O Railroad Museum in Baltimore, MD.

References